Louise of Denmark may refer to:
 Louise of Mecklenburg-Güstrow (1667–1721), wife of Frederick IV of Denmark
 Louise, Duchess of Saxe-Hildburghausen (1726–1756), daughter of Christian VI of Denmark and wife of Ernest Frederick III, Duke of Saxe-Hildburghausen
 Louise of Great Britain (1724–1751), wife of Frederick V of Denmark 
 Louise, Princess Charles of Hesse-Kassel, daughter of Frederick V of Denmark and wife of Landgrave Charles of Hesse-Kassel
 Princess Louise Charlotte of Denmark (1789–1864), daughter of Frederick, Hereditary Prince of Denmark, and wife of Landgrave William of Hesse-Kassel
 Princess Louise Auguste of Denmark (1771–1843), daughter of Christian VII of Denmark and wife of Frederick Christian II, Duke of Schleswig-Holstein-Sonderburg-Augustenburg
 Louise of Hesse-Kassel (1817–1898), wife of Christian IX of Denmark
 Louise of Sweden (1851–1926), wife of Frederick VIII of Denmark
 Louise, Princess Friedrich of Schaumburg-Lippe (1875–1906), daughter of Frederick VIII of Denmark and wife of Prince Friedrich Georg of Schaumburg-Lippe